Schwarz is a common surname, derived from the German , , meaning the color black. Notable people with the surname include:

Adolf Schwarz (1836–1910), Austrian-Hungarian chess master
Alan Schwarz (born 1968), American writer
Albert Schwarz (born 1934), Russian-born American mathematician and theoretical physicist
Andreas Schwarz (born 1965), German politician
Benjamin Schwarz (writer) (born 1963), American writer
Berthold Schwarz, Franciscan friar
Bill Schwarz, British academic and writer
Brinsley Schwarz (musician), English guitarist
Christian Friedrich Schwarz (1726–1798), German Protestant missionary
Christine Schwarz-Fuchs (born 1974), Austrian entrepreneur and politician
Daniel R. Schwarz (born 1941), professor of English literature
Danny Schwarz (model) (born 1987), English model
David Schwarz (aviation inventor) (1852–1897), Hungarian–Croatian aviation pioneer
David Schwarz (footballer) (born 1972), Australian Rules footballer
Elisabeth Schwarz (born 1984), Austrian operatic soprano
Ernst Schwarz (politician) (1886–1958), Communist politician
Ernst Schwarz (sinologist) (1916–2003), Austrian sinologist and translator
Ernst Schwarz (zoologist) (1889–1962), German zoologist, mammalogist, and herpetologist
Eugene Amandus Schwarz (1844–1928), German-American entomologist
François Xavier de Schwarz (1762–1826), Badener who became a French general
Franz Xaver Schwarz (1875–1947), Nazi treasurer
Frederick August Otto Schwarz (1836–1911), German immigrant founder of F.A.O. Schwarz
Friederike Schwarz (1910-1945), composer, educator and journalist
Gerard Schwarz (born 1947), American conductor
Gotthold Schwarz (born 1952), German bass-baritone and conductor
Hans Schwarz (born 1939), German Lutheran theologian
Harry Schwarz (1924–2010), South African lawyer, politician, diplomat and anti-apartheid leader
Heinrich Schwarz (1906–1947), German SS Nazi concentration camp commandant executed for war crimes
Henning Schwarz (1928–1993), German politician
Herbert Ferlando Schwarz (1883-1960), American entomologist and son of F.A.O. Schwarz
Hermann Schwarz (philosopher) (1864–1951), German philosopher
Hermann Amandus Schwarz (1843–1921), German mathematician
Jacques Schwarz (1856–1921), Austrian chess player
Jaecki Schwarz (born 1946), German actor
Jessica Schwarz (born 1977), German film and TV actress
Joe Schwarz (born 1937), U.S. congressman from Michigan
John H. Schwarz (born 1941), American theoretical physicist and one of the founders of string theory
Johann Georg Schwarz (1751–87), Russian Freemason
Josef Schwarz (born 1941), Czech-born German long jumper
Karen Schwarz (born 1984), Peruvian beauty pageant titleholder and Miss Perú, represented Peru in Miss Universe 2009
Karl Schwarz (1812–1885), German Protestant theologian
Lavoslav Schwarz (1837–1906), Croatian merchant and a historically significant figure of the Jewish community in Zagreb
Leo Schwarz (1931–2018), German Roman Catholic titular bishop
Marie Beatrice Schol-Schwarz, (1898 – 1969), phytopathologist and discovered the causal agent of Dutch elm disease
Michael Schwarz (disambiguation), several people
Mommie Schwarz (1876–1942), Dutch painter
Paul Schwarz (1867–1939), German orientalist
Reggie Schwarz (1875–1918), Anglo-South African cricketer and rugby union player
Robert Schwarz Strauss (1918–2014), American government officer
Rodolfo Barragán Schwarz, (1931–2017) Mexican architect 
Rudolf Schwarz (conductor) (1905–1994), Austrian conductor
Silke Schwarz, German wheelchair fencer
Stefan Schwarz (born 1969), Swedish midfielder
Udo Schwarz (born 1986), German rugby union international
Christian Schwarz-Schilling (born 1930), German politician

German-language surnames
Surnames from nicknames